Rade is a municipality in the district of Steinburg in Schleswig-Holstein, Germany.

Geography
The village is located in Aukrug Nature Park, 5 km in north of Kellinghusen, 18 km in southwest of Neumünster, 20 km in northeast of Itzehoe, and 65 km in north of Hamburg. The rivers Stör, Bullenbach, and Kirchweddelbach, flow into its municipal territory.

Main sights
The Low German house "Gut Karolinenthal", at Dorfstraße 22

References

External links

 Official site of Amt Kellinghusen

Steinburg